The Egypt Party is a political party started by Muslim preacher Amr Khaled. He stepped down as party head in July 2013. The former interim Minister of State for Youth, Khaled Abdel-Aziz, is a member of the Egypt Party.

References

2012 establishments in Egypt
Centrist parties in Egypt
Islamic political parties in Egypt
Political parties established in 2012
Political parties in Egypt